Television was introduced in Czechoslovakia in 1953. Experimental projects with DVB-T started in 2000. Finally on 21 October 2005, multiplex A (DVB-T) was launched with three channels of Česká televize and one of TV Nova and radio channels of Český rozhlas.

On 12 April 2006, six digital terrestrial television licenses were awarded to commercial broadcasters. The receivers of the licenses were: Z1, TV Pohoda, Regionální televizni agentura (RTA), Febio TV, TV Barrandov and Óčko. However, because of delays some projects lost investors and will not start (e.g. Fabio, Pohoda) or were cancelled. Z1 provided a news service in from 2008 to January 2011, when it ceased broadcasting. Óčko delivers a music service. TV Barrandov provides general programming services.

Czech Republic become the first country in central and eastern Europe to start to end all analogue broadcasts in November 2011. The process completed when the last analogue transmitters in south-east Moravia and northern Moravia-Silesia were shut down on 30 June 2012.

Milestone of digitalization 
In September 2008, when multiplex A was available in Prague, Central Bohemian Region, in surrounding areas of Brno, Ostrava, Domažlice and Ústí nad Labem, leave this multiplex with their 4 channels Česká televize.
All channels of Česká televize (ČT1, ČT2, ČT24 and ČT4) is now in multiplex 1 (with can be seen in Bohemia (except few exceptions), in surrounding areas of Brno and in Ostrava).
Multiplex A transform to multiplex 2 with stations TV Prima, Prima Cool / TV R1, TV Barrandov, TV Nova and Nova Cinema. The cover is very similar as multiplex 1, except southeast part of Bohemie.
Multiplex B transform to multiplex 3. Now there are broadcasting "Public TV" (its commercial station), Z1 and until 31 July 2009 Óčko. In Prague there is broadcasting multiplex 3 on two frequency. On one of this frequency you can see also Noe TV and Prima HDTV. Multiplex 3 covered just Prague, Brno, Ostrava, Plzeň and Ústí nad Labem. This multiplex now had problem to find reliable stations to broadcast.
There is also multiplex 4 which is operated by O2, but there is broadcast only ČT1 HD and Nova HDTV and covered is just center of Prague, center of Plzeň, center of Ostrava and center of Brno.

Czech TV crisis 

The "Czech TV crisis" occurred at the end of 2000 and lasted until early 2001 as a battle for control of ČT, which included jamming and accusations of censorship. During the Czech TV crisis, ČT reporters organized an industrial dispute by staging a sit-in and occupying the news studio, and rejected attempts by Jana Bobošíková, the newly appointed head of the news department, to fire them. They were supported in their protest by politicians such as the then President Václav Havel and by Czech celebrities, but every time they tried to air their news broadcasts, Jana Bobošíková and Jiří Hodač would jam the transmission either with a "technical fault" screen reading: "An unauthorized signal has entered this transmitter. Broadcasting will resume in a few minutes," or with their own news broadcasts featuring Bobošíková and a team she had hired to "replace" the staff members she had sought to terminate. The Czech TV crisis eventually ended in early 2001, following the departure from ČT of Hodač and Bobošíková, under pressure by the street demonstration participants and at the request of the Czech Parliament, which had held an emergency session due to the crisis.

Most-viewed channels 
The ATO measures television ratings in the Czech Republic. The channels with most share according to ATO's measurements were:

Market share

List of channels

Terrestrial free-to-air channels (DVB-T2 & Satellite) 
Czech Television - public service broadcaster
 ČT1 (HD) - main channel
 ČT2 (HD) - second main channel
 ČT24 (HD) - news channel 
 ČT Sport (HD) - sport channel 
 ČT :D (HD) / ČT art (HD) - time shared position (channel for kids / art channel) 
Nova Group (PPF)
 TV Nova (HD) - main channel
 Nova Cinema (HD) - movie channel
 Nova Action (HD) - channel for men  
 Nova Fun (HD) - channel for younger 
 Nova Gold (HD) - archive channel
 Nova Lady (HD) - channel for women 
 Nova Sport 1 (HD) - sport channel with pay TV
 Nova Sport 2 (HD) - sport channel with pay TV
 Nova Sport 3 (HD) - sport channel with pay TV
 Nova Sport 4 (HD) - sport channel with pay TV
 Prima Group (FTV Prima Group)
 TV Prima (HD) - main channel
 Prima Cool (HD) - channel for younger 
 Prima Love (HD) - channel for women 
 Prima Zoom (HD) - documentary programs
 Prima Max (HD) - movie channel
 Prima Krimi (HD) - crime series programs
 CNN Prima NEWS (HD) - news channel
 Prima Star (HD) - archive channel
 Prima Show (HD) - reality show programs
 Prima +1 - timeshifted channel
 TV Barrandov
 TV Barrandov (HD) - main channel
 Kino Barrandov (HD) - movie channel
 Barrandov Krimi (HD) - crime documentary programs
 Markíza Slovakia (PPF)
 Markíza International - czech version with Markíza
 JOJ Czech (J&T Group)
 JOJ Family - czech version for TV JOJ
 JOJ Cinema (HD) - movie channel with pay TV
 CS Mystery - sci-fi documentary programs (former Kinosvět)
 Stanice O
 Óčko - music channel
 Óčko Expres - music channel with pay TV
 Óčko Black - hip hop & rock music channel
 Óčko STAR - retro music channel
 Seznam.cz
 Seznam.cz TV (HD) - main channel
 Paramount Networks EMEAA
 Paramount Network - serial & movie channel
 AMC Networks International Central Europe
 Spektrum Home
 TV NOE 
 DofE
 Šláger Originál
 Rebel
 Relax (former TV Pohoda)
 SPORT 5
 ABC TV
 Retro Music TV
 Nalaďte se na digitální vysílání CRA
 Televize pres antenu

Regional terrestrial free-to-air channels (DVB-T2) 

 Praha TV
 Brno TV 1
 Info TV Brno a Jižní Morava
 Polar
 JTV
 JČ1 Televize jižní Čechy
 JČ2 Televize jižní Čechy
 i-Vysočina.cz
 LTV PLUS 
 Plzeň TV
 RTM+
 TV Morava
 TVS
 TV ZAK
 Ústecká TV 
 V1

Premium channels

Film 
HBO (HD) (version for Czech Republic and Slovakia)
HBO 2 (HD)
HBO 3 (HD) (former HBO Comedy)
Cinemax (HD)
Cinemax 2 (HD)
AMC (former MGM Channel)
TCM (English audio only)
Film Europe (HD)
Film Europe+
Film+ (HD)
FilmBox
FilmBox Arthouse
FilmBox Plus
FilmBox Premium (HD)
FilmBox Family
FilmBox Extra HD
CS Film / CS Horor

Entertainment 
AXN (HD) (version for Czech Republic and Slovakia)
AXN Black
AXN White
Canal+ Domo
Comedy Central Extra (Czech subtitles)
E!
Epic Drama
Fashionbox HD
Fashion TV (version for Czech Republic and Slovakia)
Food Network (English audio only)
HGTV
TLC
Hobby TV
Mňam TV
Mňau TV
SYFY (coming soon)

Documentary 
Animal Planet (HD)
BBC Earth
CBS Reality (former Zone Reality)
Discovery Channel Europe (HD)
Discovery Science 
DTX 
Investigation Discovery
Docubox HD (English audio only)
NASA UHD
National Geographic (HD) (version for Czech Republic and Slovakia)
Nat Geo Wild (HD)
H2 (English audio only)
History Channel (HD)
Crime and Investigation Network
Spektrum (HD) (version for Czech Republic and Slovakia)
Spektrum Home (former TV Deko)
Travel Channel (HD)
TV Paprika 
Fishing & Hunting TV
Wild TV
Travel xp
UP network
Viasat History (HD)
Viasat Explorer (HD)
Viasat Nature (HD)
Love Nature
Nautical Channel
CS History

Sport 
Canal+ Sport (version for Czech Republic and Slovakia)
Eurosport (HD)
Eurosport 2 (HD)
Extreme Sports Channel (Czech subtitles)
Fast&FunBox HD
FightBox (English audio only)
O2 TV Sport
O2 TV Fotbal
O2 TV Tenis
Sport 1 (HD)
Sport 2 (HD)
Sport 5
Arena Sport 1 (HD)
Arena Sport 2 (HD)
Premier Sport 1 (HD)
Premier Sport 2 (HD)
Auto, Motor & Sport (HD) (version for Czech Republic and Slovakia) 
Ginx Esports TV (English audio only)
Golf Channel (HD) (version for Czech Republic and Slovakia)

Kids and teens 
Disney Channel  (former Jetix) (version for Czech Republic and Slovakia)
Disney Junior (English audio only)
Cartoon Network
Boomerang
Nickelodeon (version for Czech Republic and Slovakia)
Nick Jr.
Nicktoons
Jim Jam
Minimax
Ducktv (HD)
Baby TV

Music 
MTV Europe (Czech localization)
MTV Music (UK version)
MTV Hits (European version)
MTV Live (UK version)
Club MTV (European version) 
MTV 80s (European version)
MTV 90s (European version)
MTV 00s (European version)
Music Box
Retro Music Television (FTA in regional DVB-T)
Šláger Dechovka
Šláger Muzika
Šláger Premium
Stingray Classica
Stingray CMusic
Stingray iConcerts
Mezzo (French version)
Mezzo Live HD (French version)
Deluxe Music
360 TuneBox (HD)

Erotica 
Leo TV
Extasy TV
Blue Hustler
Hustler TV
Penthouse TV (HD)
Playboy TV (HD)
Brazzers TV Europe (former Private Spice)
Dorcel TV (HD)
Dorcel XXX (HD)
Private TV (former Daring TV! (former XXX X-Treme))
EroX (HD)
EroXXX (HD)
Man-X
X-MO
The Adult Channel (UK version)

News 
Al Jazeera
Arirang
BBC World News
Bloomberg
CGTN
CNBC
CNN
DW
Euronews
France 24
NHK World Japan
Sky News
TA3 (Slovak version)
TRT World

See also 
 List of television stations

References 

 
Television networks
Czech entertainment-related lists